Cornflakes for Tea is a 1981 Australian children's miniseries.

Story

The series is about three children abandoned by parents, who are hiding from authorities so they can reunite with their grandmother.

References

External links
 Cornflakes for Tea at AustLit
Cornflakes for Tea at OzMovies
 Cornflakes for Tea at IMDb

Australian children's television series
English-language television shows
1980s Australian television miniseries
1981 Australian television series debuts
1981 Australian television series endings
1981 television films
1981 films